The 1941 constitution of Sarawak is the first known written constitution in the Raj of Sarawak Borneo. The objective of this constitution was to approve and fulfill the promise upheld by the third white rajah of Sarawak, Charles Vyner Brooke — to give self-governance of Sarawak to the locals. However, his constitution was not implemented due to the Japanese Occupation. With the devastation and financial struggle of Sarawak, Charles Brooke without the discussion and approval of the local Malay and Dayaks leaders decided to submit Sarawak to the British. This caused huge dissatisfaction among the locals, who would later form a protest about the cession of Sarawak to the United Kingdom.

Among the contents are:

1. Charles Vyner Brooke handing absolute power to the Supreme Council and the Council of State 
2. Sarawak kings ruled with the advice of the Supreme Council 
3. The State Council is authorised to approve laws and financial management 
4. The King has the power to overturn legislation passed by the State Council 
5. The King appoints most of the members of the Supreme Council and the Council of State

See also
Nine Cardinal Principles of the rule of the English Rajah

1941 in law
Sarawak
Raj of Sarawak
20th century in Sarawak
Defunct constitutions
Constitution of Malaysia
British Empire in World War II
1941 documents